Gaetano Giuseppe Faostino Meo (1849, Basilicata, Italy – 16 January 1925, London, United Kingdom)  was an Italian-British artist's model, landscape painter, and a noted craftsman in mosaic and stained glass. His unpublished autobiography is a useful source for art historians of the Aesthetic Movement and Edwardian Era.

Model
He was a son of Rocco Meo, an Italian shepherd of Greek descent whose surname was probably a diminutive version of Bartolomeo, and Maria Francesca Meo (nee Pignone). He had at least three elder brothers and a younger sister, and grew up in the town of Laurenzana, in Basilicata, southern Italy. In 1864, Meo (age 15) and an older brother walked from Naples to Paris. Playing harp and lute, they supported themselves as street musicians while saving money for passage to the United States. By 1866, Meo was posing as an artist's model in Paris. The pair lacked passports, and were smuggled into the United Kingdom aboard a freighter from Boulogne. Meo remained in London, but his brother continued on to America.

Alone in London, Meo sought to play his harp in Italian restaurants, a safer place than busking in the streets, where he was more likely to be arrested by police, and deported. Pre-Raphaelite painter Simeon Solomon claimed to have discovered the 18-year-old playing harp in the streets. "Meo represented a form of classical southern beauty much sought after in paintings of scenes from Greek mythology." In 1867, in Rome, Solomon painted a three-quarter-length watercolor of another model dressed as Bacchus. That same year, in London, he painted a head-and-bust oil portrait of Meo as Bacchus.

Meo posed for other British painters such as Ford Madox Brown, Edward Burne-Jones, Luke Fildes, Henry Holiday, Henry Holland (1839–1927), Frederic Leighton, Edwin Long, George Heming Mason, William Blake Richmond, Dante Gabriel Rossetti, and sculptor Hamo Thornycroft. By 1870, he was also working as Rossetti's studio assistant.

Male models in England generally insisted on wearing loincloths, but Meo would pose fully nude. In his autobiography, Meo contrasted how models were treated in France versus England:
In Paris the artists treated their models as friends, they were regarded as fellow workers in a great undertaking, coadjutors to whose dramatic and artistic co-operation the artists were greatly indebted. After work, the artist and his model dined together and talked, and the model, if intelligent, learnt much of Art. … But English artists were different, as a rule they treated their models as dirt! Not so Richmond and Rossetti, and Burne Jones – God bless him! – they treated their models as human beings.

Edward Burne-Jones

 
Edward Burne-Jones used his mistress, Maria Zambaco, and Meo as the models for Phyllis and Demophoön (1870). In the legend from Ovid's Heroides, Phyllis was the daughter of the King of Thrace, and Demophoön the son of King Theseus of Athens. On the day after their wedding, Demophoön departed for his father's land, promising to return for his bride. Phyllis would go to the shore each day to watch for his ship, but it never came. Finally, in despair, she hanged herself and the gods transformed her into an almond tree. When Demophoön finally did return, he remorsefully embraced the almond tree and it burst into bloom. The gods took pity on Phyllis, and transformed her back into a woman. Burne-Jones's innovation was to portray the moment of transformation, when the branches entangling Demophoön suddenly become the arms of Phyllis embracing him. "When the painting was exhibited at the Old Watercolour Society for the 1870 Summer Exhibition, great controversy followed, partially because of Burne-Jones' affair, but also as a result of Demophoön's nudity. Due to the numerous complaints, Burne-Jones withdrew the painting from the exhibition two weeks after the opening." Burne-Jones later painted another version in oil, The Tree of Forgiveness (1881-1882), with Phyllis emerging fully nude from the trunk of the tree, and Demophoön's genitals covered by drapery.

William Blake Richmond
The extremely close, nearly 50-year friendship between Meo and William Blake Richmond began with a mysterious incident. In 1872, Meo arrived unannounced at Richmond's country house seeking modeling work. He encountered a beautiful woman inside the back door, who pointed the way to the painter's studio. Meo came to believe that the woman had been the ghost of Richmond's first wife, Charlotte, and took it as an omen that the two men were intended to work together. Meo became Richmond's principal model, studio assistant and student. He likely posed for the three muscular angels guarding the funeral bier of a shrouded female corpse in The Watchers—thought to be Richmond's elegy to Charlotte. Meo later assisted Richmond on murals, acted as his business manager in negotiations with clients, and for more than ten years led the team that executed his mosaics at St. Paul's Cathedral.

Works for which Meo posed
Simeon Solomon, Bacchus (oil on paper, 1867), Birmingham Museum and Art Gallery, Birmingham, UK
Simeon Solomon, The Sleepers and One that Watcheth (watercolour, 1867), Leamington Spa Art Gallery, Warwickshire, UK
Simeon Solomon, A Prelude by Bach (watercolour, 1868), private collection
Dante Gabriel Rossetti, Dante's Dream at the Time of Beatrice's Death (watercolour, 1869-1871), Walker Art Gallery, Liverpool, UK
Rossetti painted an 1880 version in oil, now at the McManus Gallery, Dundee, UK.
Simeon Solomon, A Youth Relating Tales to Ladies, (1870), Tate Britain, London
Edward Burne-Jones, Phyllis and Demophoön (watercolour, 1870), Birmingham Museum and Art Gallery, Birmingham, UK
Burne-Jones painted a variation of this in oil, The Tree of Forgiveness (1881-1882), now at the Lady Lever Art Gallery, Liverpool, UK.
Frederic Leighton, The Arts of Industry as Applied to War (mural, 1870-1872), Victoria and Albert Museum, London
Edward Burne-Jones, Love Among the Ruins (watercolour, 1870-1873), private collection
After the watercolour was damaged, Burne-Jones painted a larger version in oil (1893-1894), now at Wightwick Manor, West Midlands, UK.
Edward Burne-Jones, The Feast of Peleus (1872, reworked 1881), Birmingham Museum and Art Gallery, Birmingham, UK 
George Heming Mason, The Harvest Moon (1872), Tate Britain, London
Luke Fildes, Fair, Quiet and Sweet Rest (1872), Warrington Museum & Art Gallery, Warrington, UK
Edward Burne-Jones, Dies Domine (watercolour, 1873-1874), unlocated. Burne-Jones portrayed Meo as Christ seated at the Last Judgment.
Dies Domine was copied as a stained-glass window (1876) for the Church of St. Michael and St. Mary Magdelene, Easthampstead, Berkshire, UK
A photogravure of Dies Domine was published in 1900.
William Blake Richmond, The Watchers (1873-1876), private collection 
Frederic Leighton, Eastern Slinger (1875)
Edward Burne-Jones, Le Chante d'Amour (The Love Song) (1877), Metropolitan Museum of Art, New York City
William Blake Richmond, The Song of Miriam (1880), Chi Mei Museum, Taiwan
Lawrence Alma-Tadema, An Audience at Agrippa's (1881), Dick Institute, Kilmarnock, UK
Henry Holiday, Dante and Beatrice (1883), Walker Art Gallery, Liverpool, UK. Holiday used another model for Dante's hands.
Hamo Thornycroft, The Mower (bronze, 1888-1890), Tate Britain, London
William Blake Richmond, Venus and Anchises (1890), Walker Art Gallery, Liverpool, UK

Artist

Painting
Under William Blake Richmond's instruction, Meo became a proficient landscape painter and exhibited at the Royal Academy of Arts. He assisted Richmond on the frescoes of Christ Church, Cheltenham (1893–95).

The Public Catalogue Foundation lists four paintings by Meo in public ownership in the United Kingdom. Looking towards London from the Heath; Tooley's Farm; and Wyldes Farm are in the collection of the Camden Council. Arundel Castle, West Sussex, Looking from the Back of the Railway Station is in the collection of Eastbourne's Towner Gallery.

Stained glass

Henry Holiday may be best known as the illustrator for Lewis Carroll's The Hunting of the Snark (1876). "Holiday was chief designer for the stained-glass makers James Powell & Sons (Whitefriar's Glass) from 1863 to 1891, and from 1875 he employed Meo in his cartoons."  By 1880, Meo had become Holiday's assistant, helping to execute his stained-glass designs.

Holiday and Richmond jointly sponsored Meo for British citizenship, that was granted in 1888. To celebrate Meo's naturalization, Holiday hosted a party, that was attended by friends, artists and art patrons, including the Duke of Devonshire. Holiday wrote satirical lyrics, tailored to Meo and set to a Gilbert and Sullivan song from H.M.S. Pinafore. From the piano, Holiday performed his verses to "He Is an Englishman," and led all in singing the choruses.

Meo assisted Richmond on stained-glass windows for the apse of St. Paul's Cathedral, including the great arched east window behind the high altar. (Richmond's windows were destroyed in 1940, during The Blitz of World War II.)

Meo also assisted Richmond on three stained-glass windows for the Lady Chapel of Holy Trinity Church, Sloane Street (1905–10).

Meo designed and executed the east window for the Church of St. Saviour (1902-1904), in St. Albans, Hertfordshire, UK.

Mosaics

In the 1880s, Powell & Sons appears to have sent Meo to Italy to study the mosaics of Ravenna, Venice, Sicily and Rome.

In 1891, Richmond was approached about painting murals for St. Paul's Cathedral in London. Instead, Richmond proposed mosaics, arguing that the cathedral's 17th century architect, Sir Christopher Wren, had intended them for its interior decoration, and that mosaics would survive for centuries. The following year Richmond received the design commission to create neo-Byzantine mosaic murals for the walls and ceiling of the cathedral's choir and apse. "Richmond chose to abandon the flat surface of mosaicists like Salviati, in favour of a more vibrant treatment, based on the use of jagged, irregular glass, set at angles to the plaster, so that it would catch the light." The commission was expanded in 1902 to include mosaics for the barrel-vaulted choir aisles and quarterdomes. For nearly twelve years, Meo led the team of craftsmen executing the mosaics in the ancient method, laying the glass piece by piece in situ into the drying plaster. The entire mosaic schedule was completed in 1904.

Meo exhibited a mosaic panel of roses at the 1904 World's Fair in St. Louis, Missouri, USA.

Executing the designs of architect Halsey Ricardo, Meo supervised creation of the large mosaic dome for the hall of Debenham House in London, 1912-1913.

Executing the designs of Scottish architect Robert Weir Schultz, Meo led the team in creating the mosaics for the Chapel of St. Andrew and the Saints of Scotland at Westminster Cathedral, 1913-1915.

Executing his own designs, Meo created mosaic panels for the Church of St. John the Baptist in Clayton, West Yorkshire, 1916-1918.

Personal

In 1868, Meo married Agnes Morton (1849–1921), from Ulster, Ireland. They set up home in Hampstead, and had six children—three sons and three daughters:
Francesco Giovanni Luigi Meo (16 August 1872, Fulham, London – 21 January 1933, East Dulwich, London) 
Margarita Maria Agnes Meo (1876, Kensington, London – 6 March 1956, Eastbourne, London)
Humbert James "Little Bertie" Meo (19 July 1878, Hampstead, London – 22 September 1885, Hendon, London)
Elena Fortuna Meo (October 1879, Hampstead, London – 24 December 1957). A professional violinist, she bore three illegitimate children by married scenic designer, art director and writer Edward Gordon Craig (1872–1966), son of actress Dame Ellen Terry.
Alfonzo Giovanni Battista Meo (4 September 1890, Hampstead, London – 10 June 1916, Somme, France). Lieutenant Giovanni Meo died in World War I during the buildup to the Battle of the Somme.
Taormina Bertha Meo (1891, Hampstead, London – 1959, Eastbourne, London)

Following his wife's 1921 death, Meo created a grave marker in Hampstead Cemetery that featured a glass mosaic of the Madonna and Child. Gaetano and Agnes Meo and their son "Little Bertie," who died at age 7, were buried there.

Film art designer and writer Edward Carrick—son of Elena Meo and Edward Gordon Craig—never finished his biography of his grandfather, Gaetano Meo. He dramatized portions of his manuscript for a 25 November 1994 broadcast on BBC Radio 3.

Helen Craig—great-granddaughter of Gaetano Meo, and daughter of Edward and Helen Godfrey Carrick—is the illustrator of the Angelina Ballerina children's stories. In 2018, she and mosaic artist Tessa Hunkin restored the Meo grave at Hampstead Cemetery.

Notes

References

External links

 

1849 births
1925 deaths
English artists' models
British landscape painters
British stained glass artists and manufacturers
Mosaic artists
Pre-Raphaelite Brotherhood artists' models
Italian emigrants to the United Kingdom
Naturalised citizens of the United Kingdom
Burials at Hampstead Cemetery